Vangelis Goutis (born 15 June 1960) is a Greek football manager.

References

1960 births
Living people
Greek football managers
Ethnikos Asteras F.C. managers
PAE Kerkyra managers
Agios Dimitrios F.C. managers
Kallithea F.C. managers
Kavala F.C. managers
Vyzas F.C. managers
Aiolikos F.C. managers
Fostiras F.C. managers